The Khomic languages are a branch of Kuki-Chin languages proposed by Peterson (2017). They are spoken mostly in southern Chin State, Myanmar and in southeastern Bangladesh.

Languages
Khomic languages include (Peterson 2017):
Khumi
Khami (Eastern Khumi)
Lemi
Mro
Rengmitca

References

Peterson, David. 2017. "On Kuki-Chin subgrouping." In Picus Sizhi Ding and Jamin Pelkey, eds. Sociohistorical linguistics in Southeast Asia: New horizons for Tibeto-Burman studies in honor of David Bradley, 189–209. Leiden: Brill.
Peterson, David A. 2012. The Khumi cluster and its place in Kuki-Chin. Paper presented at ICSTLL 45, Singapore.